Geauga Lake was an amusement park in Bainbridge Township and Aurora, Ohio. It was established in 1887, in what had been a local recreation area adjacent to a lake of the same name. The first amusement ride was added in 1889, and the park's first roller coaster later known as the Big Dipper was built in 1925. The park was sold to Funtime, Inc., in 1969 and was expanded over the years with additional rides and amenities. Funtime was acquired by Premier Parks in 1995, and for the 2000 season, they re-branded Geauga Lake as Six Flags Ohio, adding four new roller coasters. The following year, Six Flags bought the adjacent SeaWorld Ohio and combined the two parks under the name Six Flags Worlds of Adventure.

The park changed ownership again in 2004 after a purchase by Cedar Fair. The park's SeaWorld portion was transformed into a water park in 2005, and together they became known as Geauga Lake and Wildwater Kingdom. On September 21, 2007, less than a week after Geauga Lake closed for the season, Cedar Fair announced that the amusement park would be permanently closed. The water park continued to operate as Wildwater Kingdom through the 2016 season, before meeting the same fate.

History

Pre-amusement park era
Geauga Lake was originally known as "Picnic Lake" or "Giles Pond." The Geauga Lake area was home to early settlers such as the Staffords, Mark Patterson, Capt. Simon Henry with his wife Rhoda Parsons and their children, Charles Swires, the Brewsters, and Bohan Blair. There is a city park and ballfields on East Boulevard in Aurora, named after this lake. Sullivan Giles chose this area for his log cabin in 1817. He later built a large frame home on the spot behind Geauga Lake depot on the north side of the lake. When the railroad came to town in 1856, it made a stop at "pond station". Giles took advantage of his scenic lake location and, in the last half of the 19th century, established picnic grounds, a dance hall, and other entertainment near his home for the all-day pleasure of residents and those taking the train to the country.

Geauga Lake opened for picnics and swimming in 1872. An 1880 history of Geauga County reported the Giles residence "being easy of access by rail, has become, within a few years, a very popular place of resort during the summer months, for fishing, picnic, and excursion parties" and "for the convenience of such parties, Mr. Giles has recently erected a hall of considerable size near the lake. The surrounding grounds are kept clean and attractive, and, without exception, this is the most charming place to spend a leisure day to be found in this section." At the time, a full-sized steamboat circled the lake, towing a large scow, topped with a dance floor. The boat, first owned by William Banford and Rowe Fuller, was later purchased by the Kents. In 1907, the boat was shipped by rail to Brady Lake near Kent.

1887–1969: Geauga Lake amusement park
Geauga Lake park was established in 1887. Three major league baseball games were played on Sundays at Geauga Lake in 1888 (plus a Thursday exhibition game) by the Cleveland Forest Citys of the major league American Association. By 1889, the park installed its first ride, a steam-powered carousel. More rides would follow.

William J. Kuhlman expanded the park in 1925 and added the Big Dipper and the park's Olympic-sized swimming pool which stayed in operation until the mid-1960s. On Sunday, July 11, 1926, Olympic medalist and Tarzan actor Johnny Weissmuller set a new world record in the 220-yard freestyle swim in the pool in front of 3,000 spectators. Lake swimming also continued over the coming decades. Many amusement parks at the time had race tracks, dance halls, and sometimes a theater and bowling alley, making them year-round attractions. The race track was added in 1931, although it closed in 1969. The theater, dance hall, and bowling alley were also added around the same time. In 1937, the park's 1926 hand-carved Marcus Illions Carousel was added, after having been located in Philadelphia and Birmingham, at a cost of $35,000.

At that point, the park's dance hall and ballroom were major draws, with big band music performed by Guy Lombardo, Fred Waring, Artie Shaw, and other big names of the time.

In 1942, a tornado hit the park, injuring six, destroying multiple buildings, and damaging the Big Dipper. The park reported $50,000 in damages, but it quickly rebuilt.

In July 1944, Viola Schryer ("Vi") took over management of the park after the death of her uncle William Kuhlman.

In 1952, a fire destroyed the park's bowling alley, theater, dance hall and roller rink with damages estimated at $500,000. At that time the park became strictly a seasonal amusement park, beach, and swimming area. The pool was closed and razed in the early 1960s, but lake swimming continued.

1969–2000: Geauga Lake amusement park (Funtime era)
In 1969, Funtime Incorporated purchased the park. Funtime was formed to purchase Geauga Lake by former managers of Cedar Point, Earl Gascoigne, Gaspar Lococo, and M.P. Jacobson. The focus continued to be rides and swimming. The racetrack closed and was razed in 1969. In 1970 a marine life park, SeaWorld Ohio, was built across the lake from the amusement park after Funtime persuaded SeaWorld to build the marine park on the other side of the lake. SeaWorld and Geauga Lake were friendly neighbors for 30 years working together to become a regional destination. SeaWorld focused on marine life and shows, while Geauga Lake focused on thrill rides and swimming. SeaWorld was purchased by Harcourt Brace Jovanovich in 1976 and later by Busch Entertainment Corp in late 1989.

In 1972, the Gold Rush log flume water ride was added, and two years later Geauga Lake added the Skyscraper, which took passengers up 21 stories for views of the park. Admission to the park was free until 1972. Until then, rides on various attractions were purchased on a pay-as-you-go basis. Beginning in 1973, the park converted to an admission charge with a pay-one-price for all the rides and attractions. The Geauga Dog became the park's mascot and would remain so until 1999. In 1976, the park added the Wildcat compact steel roller coaster, and a year later the park added the Double Loop, a looping steel coaster. For a time, the park ran a short-lived series of TV commercials featuring Geauga Dog and a singing, dancing adolescent boy performing a song about the park. The boy's off-key singing and awful dancing were deliberate, a means of getting viewers to notice the ad. It succeeded.

Corkscrew coaster made its debut in 1978, making Geauga Lake the first amusement park in Ohio and one of the first amusement parks anywhere to have two looping coasters. Swimming in the lake continued to be a feature at the park, and in 1983, the park added Boardwalk Shores, which featured a paddleboat marina, a new bath house, a children's swimming pool area and water slides. A year later, The Wave, the only authentic tsunami wave pool in the Midwest at the time, opened to rave reviews.

In 1985, Harcourt Brace Jovanovich, owner of SeaWorld, announced their intent to purchase Funtime and combine the two parks, but the deal fell through. In 1986, more children's rides were added and themed as Rainbow Island, a children's dry ride area. Stingray water slides and the Euroracer Grand Prix rides were added.

In 1988, Geauga Lake celebrated its centennial by introducing the Raging Wolf Bobs, a wooden roller coaster with a hybrid twister/out and back design modeled after the original Bobs roller coaster at Chicago's defunct Riverview Park. Two years later, the park re-themed the children's water area as Turtle Beach, which was advertised as the ultimate children's water playground. Geauga Lake expanded its midway with The Mirage and the $2.1 million Texas Twister in the early 1990s.

A corporate deal in 1995 saw Premier Parks acquiring Funtime, giving Geauga Lake a new owner. Premier Parks invested $9 million in new rides, including the Mind Eraser, a steel looping shuttle coaster designed by Vekoma, and Grizzly Run, a water rapids ride designed by Intamin. These attractions opened in 1996, and the Corkscrew was closed and sold and moved to Dizzee World in Chennai, Tamil Nadu India. Several new water slides were also added. Mr. Hyde's Nasty Fall, an Intamin first generation freefall ride was also added in 1997.

In 1998, Premier Parks purchased Six Flags from Time Warner. Serial Thriller, later known as Thunderhawk, was added. The next year, Americana, Time Warp, and an up-charge attraction Skycoaster were added. Premier Parks re-branded Geauga Lake in 2000 as Six Flags Ohio.

2000–2004: Six Flags era

In 2000, Geauga Lake received a $40 million expansion and became Six Flags Ohio. As part of that expansion, the park received 20 new rides, including four new roller coasters. A junior roller coaster called Road Runner Express, a wooden roller coaster called Villain, a Floorless roller coaster called Batman: Knight Flight and an Inverted impulse roller coaster called Superman: Ultimate Escape. Also added was a new shoot the chute water ride named Shipwreck Falls and a new wave pool in the water park. The old wave pool was razed, filled, and used for a new Looney Tunes themed kids' area known as Looney Tunes Boomtown.

Busch Entertainment determined that its SeaWorld parks should feature roller coasters, water rides, and other attractions to supplement the marine displays and shows, and the company began de-emphasizing the educational aspects of its parks. They began modifying their Orlando, San Antonio, and to a lesser extent their San Diego parks to reflect this. Due to Six Flags Ohio's close proximity, as well as the fact that the SeaWorld side of the lake had height restrictions, Busch approached Six Flags about buying the Six Flags park. Six Flags then made a counter offer to instead buy SeaWorld Ohio. That winter, Six Flags purchased SeaWorld for $110 million in cash, merging the two complexes into one, and changing the entire complex's name to Six Flags Worlds of Adventure. By combining the parks, Six Flags created the largest theme park in the world to date, at 700 acres. The SeaWorld side became known as the "Wild Life" area and remained primarily marine life shows, with a few portable children's rides placed throughout. In 2001, the park had plans to construct a 200-foot tall hypercoaster on the SeaWorld side of the park, but later abandoned those plans due to height restrictions and other conflicts with the city of Aurora. In 2002, Shamu was replaced by Shouka, who came on a breeding loan from Marineland in Antibes, France. The original amusement park area became known as the "Wild Rides" area and continued expansion with a Vekoma Flying roller coaster called X-Flight. The small water park area also continued, so the park was marketed as "Three Parks for One Price".

In hopes to expand the water park area, the addition of Hurricane Mountain, the then-largest water slide complex in North America, occurred in 2003 and the water park area was later renamed Hurricane Harbor.

2004–2007: Cedar Fair era

Facing financial difficulties across its chain and high debt, Six Flags considered selling the park. The deal was finalized less than a month later for $145 million. The Geauga Lake name was promptly restored to the park. To conform with copyright and trademark laws, all Looney Tunes and DC Comics branding was removed from the names of rides, roller coasters, and attractions, as well as walk-around character costumes which were replaced with Peanuts characters (other Cedar Fair parks began doing it in 2010 replacing Nickelodeon characters). The Looney Tunes Boomtown kids area was renamed Kidworks. The Hurricane Harbor water park area was renamed Hurricane Hannah's Waterpark. The marine life portion of the park was closed and demolished, and the animals were relocated to other Six Flags parks such as Six Flags Marine World and Great Adventure.

Examples of name changes that took place include:
 Batman: Knight Flight lost the Batman theming and opened in 2004 under the name of Dominator
 Mind Eraser was renamed Head Spin
 Serial Thriller was renamed Thunderhawk
 Superman: Ultimate Escape was renamed Steel Venom
 Road Runner Express was renamed the Beaver Land Mine Ride

In 2005, Cedar Fair invested $26 million in Wildwater Kingdom, a new water park on the former SeaWorld site, which resulted in the name being altered slightly to Geauga Lake & Wildwater Kingdom. The Wildwater Kingdom side had about six water slides and a children's water play area. The Hurricane Hannah area remained. Mr. Hyde's Nasty Fall was closed at the end of 2005. Usable parts were salvaged for Demon Drop, then at Cedar Point, and the rest was scrapped.

In 2006, Wildwater Kingdom was expanded to include Tidal Wave Bay. The Hurricane Hannah area was then shut down, leaving Wildwater Kingdom as the remaining water park. The season was also scaled back, eliminating the spring and fall weekend operations and opening strictly between Memorial Day and Labor Day with one last weekend in mid-September. At the end of the season, the X-Flight roller coaster was removed, as well as Steel Venom (formerly Superman The Ultimate Escape). X-Flight was relocated to Kings Island and opened as Firehawk in 2007. Steel Venom was relocated to Dorney Park, where it opened for the 2008 season as Voodoo, until 2009 when it was renamed Possessed.

Decline
Combined attendance at both parks reached an estimated 2.7 million visitors in 2001. By 2004, total park attendance had fallen to approximately 700,000 despite a $40 million investment on rides in 2000. Citing the Cleveland area as their "most difficult market", Six Flags sold Worlds of Adventure to Cedar Fair in March 2004. Speculation that the amusement park side would eventually close began after Cedar Fair relocated two major roller coasters – Steel Venom and X-Flight – to other parks prior to the 2007 season.

Closing and land redevelopment

In 2007, the summer-only operation of Geauga Lake continued. The annual Oktoberfest festival weekend held in September every year concluded on September 16, 2007, marking the amusement park's last day of operation. On September 21, 2007, Cedar Fair announced that the ride side of Geauga Lake would permanently close, and that the water park side would continue to operate the following season as Geauga Lake's Wildwater Kingdom. Cedar Fair also announced plans to move existing rides to its other properties. This led to efforts to save Geauga Lake, especially landmarks such as the Big Dipper and the Carousel, through an online petition and letters to public officials.

Cedar Fair placed the amusement park side's land up for sale. The remaining rides and remnants were auctioned separately on June 17, 2008. Many returned to the park for one last visit preview and auction days.

In 2012 and 2013, Cleveland-based photographer and artist Johnny Joo visited Geauga Lake to capture the park in a state of decay. These photos brought heavy local attention from families who had remembered the park in its heyday.

As late as January 2013, the Geauga Lake side was still for sale and projects similar to Crocker Park in Westlake, Ohio were being considered. Bainbridge Township and Cedar Fair hoped to have it resolved by the end of 2013. In March 2013, Cedar Fair announced that they were putting Geauga Lake's property up for sale again. Unlike before, they were willing to sell the land in parcels. Several companies showed interest in the land. On September 17, 2017, a plaque was unveiled in memory of the park.

On August 25, 2020, it was announced that PulteGroup, a home construction company, would be building a housing development on the site of the Wildwater Kingdom parking lot. PulteGroup acquired the 245 acre portion of the property that is in the city limits of Aurora, Ohio for $2 million. The development, known as Renaissance Park at Geauga Lake, would include street names like "Carousel Court" and "Dipper Way" to pay tribute to former Geauga Lake attractions. PulteGroup said that homes will be available for sale by March 2021. In October 2020, developer Industrial Commercial Properties bought the remaining 377 acres of the property with plans to build homes, restaurants, and retail establishments there.

Fate of Geauga Lake's coasters

 Beaver Land Mine Ride: Sold to Papéa Parc amusement park in Yvré-l'Evêque, France.
 Big Dipper: The roller coaster was listed for auction on eBay in 2010 but failed to receive a bid; it was demolished in October 2016.
 Dominator: Relocated to Kings Dominion.
 Double Loop: Demolished, sold to Cleveland Scrap for $25,000.
 Head Spin: Relocated to Carowinds as The Flying Cobras.
 Cyclone: Renamed Avalanche and travels with Amusements of America. Removed in 1980.
 Little Dipper: Removed in 1975.
 Raging Wolf Bobs: Demolished. Purchased for $2,500 at auction; some wood and track sold in online auctions; steel track, station, and all mechanical elements removed in 2008; part of track and car donated to Geauga County Historical Society. Two of the original red PTC cars were acquired in 2017 by the Amusement Preservation Museum, and have been fully restored.
 Steel Venom: Relocated to Dorney Park & Wildwater Kingdom as Possessed.
 Thunderhawk: Relocated to Michigan's Adventure.
 Villain: Demolished, sold to Cleveland Scrap for $2,500.
 Wild Mouse: Relocated in 1972 to Chippewa Lake Park. It closed in 1978 alongside the park, and it was eventually taken down in Spring of 2013.
 X-Flight: Relocated in March 2007 to Kings Island as Firehawk. It closed on October 28, 2018. It was demolished and removed from Kings Island after the 2018 season.

Past coasters and attractions
The number of former attractions at the park reflects the different visions each of the owners had for the park. Below are some of the park's former rides that have been removed or are now operating at another amusement park.

Roller coasters

Other attractions

Looney Tunes Boomtown

Hurricane Harbor

Previous names and management
This property has changed hands several times, although there were only four ownership changes in the 124-year span from 1872 to 1996.

The park was originally two parks: Geauga Lake and SeaWorld Ohio. Geauga Lake became Six Flags Ohio in 2000; before the 2001 season SeaWorld was purchased by Six Flags and the entire complex was combined and renamed Six Flags Worlds of Adventure.

See also 
Incidents at Geauga Lake

References

Further reading

External links

 
 Official Site of Wildwater Kingdom
 Aurora Historical Society, has a large collection of GL and Sea World items and history
 Geauga Lake Park 1888-2007- Geauga Lake Park, Today and Forever. Photos and maps
 

 
Amusement parks in Ohio
Buildings and structures in Geauga County, Ohio
Buildings and structures in Portage County, Ohio
Tourist attractions in Geauga County, Ohio
Tourist attractions in Portage County, Ohio
Cedar Fair amusement parks
1887 establishments in Ohio
2007 disestablishments in Ohio
Defunct amusement parks in Ohio
Aurora, Ohio
Funtime, Inc.